For statistics in probability theory, the Boolean-Poisson model  or simply Boolean model for a random subset of the plane (or higher dimensions, analogously) is one of the simplest and most tractable models in stochastic geometry. Take a Poisson point process of rate  in the plane and make each point be the center of a random set; the resulting union of overlapping sets is a realization of the Boolean model .
 of translated sets.

As related topics, the case of constant-sized discs is the basic model of continuum percolation
and the low-density Boolean models serve as a first-order approximations in the 
study of extremes in many models.

References

Spatial processes